CS Otopeni was a Romanian professional football club from Otopeni, Ilfov County, founded in 2001 and dissolved in 2013. Its greatest performance was that it played for one season in the Liga I in the 2008–09 season.

History

The club was founded in 2001 at the initiative of the mayor of the locality, Silviu Constantin Gheorghe. In the first season, 2001–02, in the Ilfov County Championship, missed the direct promotion in front of Sportul Ciorogârla, but managing to reach the Liga III after he bought the place from Conired Pucioasa and it soon made way from the Liga III to the Liga I.

In 2008 the team on the outskirts of Bucharest managed the biggest performance in the club's history, namely promoting to the Liga I. Because its own stadium in Otopeni didn't meet the licensing conditions for the first league, the team played its matches on Astra Stadium.

It didn't achieve much in Romania's top football division, finishing next to last and relegating back to the Liga II.

The following seasons it finished 6th, 6th, 12th and 4th in the Second Division.

In the summer of 2013 the club was withdrawn from the Liga II by its owners and dissolved.

Honours

Liga I:
Winners (0):, Best finish: 17th 2008–09

Liga II:
Winners (0):
Runners-up (1): 2007–08

Liga III:
Winners (1): 2003–04

Notable managers
Liviu Ciobotariu
Marian Bucurescu
Gabriel Mărgărit
Miodrag Jesic
Pipa Marian

References

External links
Official website 

 
Association football clubs established in 2001
Association football clubs disestablished in 2013
Defunct football clubs in Romania
Football clubs in Ilfov County
Liga I clubs
Liga II clubs
Liga III clubs
2001 establishments in Romania
2013 disestablishments in Romania